The Kawasaki W800 is a parallel twin motorcycle produced by Kawasaki from 2011 to 2016, and then since 2019. The W800 is a retro style model that emulates the Kawasaki W series, three models that were produced from 1967 to 1975, and which in turn were based on the British BSA A7. It replaced the W650, which was produced from 1999 to 2007. The W800 has an air-cooled,  360° parallel-twin, four-stroke engine, with shaft and bevel gear driven overhead cam. The carburettor-fuelled W650 was discontinued because it could not meet emissions regulations, so the W800 engine is fuel injected. Unlike the W650, the W800 does not have a kickstart.

The retro style includes a highly polished, gloss-painted and pinstriped fuel tank, as well as a ribbed saddle, wire wheels and a special W-logo on both sides of the tank, which refers to the W1-model. Besides the regular W800 model there is the W800 Special Edition. In 2012 the S.E. has gold-anodised wheelrims, 2 black exhausts, black engine.
For both models, there is the Café Style option, with a front cowl, and a cafe racer inspired seat.

Kevin Ash wrote, "the performance feels distinctly retro too, but in a good way, as the W800 purrs along. The sound is friendly and mellow and the engine pulls well enough not to feel breathless, as the W650 could".

References

External links
 
 W800 at Kawasaki UK

W800
Standard motorcycles
Motorcycles introduced in 2011
Motorcycles powered by straight-twin engines